Mark Twain Casino and RV Park  is a casino located in La Grange, Missouri owned by Affinity Gaming. LaGrange is in Northeast Missouri and sits on the Mississippi River. The property has an  casino. The casino floor has over 420 slot machines and video poker, as well as 6 table games.

History
The Mark Twain Casino opened July 21, 2005 and was first operated by Grace Entertainment. Mark Twain Casino and RV Park was one of three Midwest casinos acquired from Grace Entertainment in 2005 for $287 million. The other casinos were St. Jo Frontier Casino in St. Joseph, Missouri and Lakeside Hotel and Casino in Osceola, Iowa. When Herbst Gaming took over, the casino's name was changed to Terrible's Mark Twain Casino. In May 2011, Herbst Gaming changed its name to Affinity Gaming, and the casino's name reverted to its original name, dropping "Terrible's". Michael Silberling was named CEO of Affinity Gaming in August 2014.

Attractions

The venue's RV park has 8 RV hook up spaces with level concrete pads, room for slide-outs, water and electrical hook-ups.

References

External links
Mark Twain Casino & RV Park

Casinos in Missouri
Affinity Gaming
Buildings and structures in Lewis County, Missouri
Riverboat casinos
Tourist attractions in Lewis County, Missouri
Mark Twain